Josué Filipe Soares Pesqueira (born 17 September 1990), known simply as Josué, is a Portuguese professional footballer who plays for Polish club Legia Warsaw as an attacking midfielder.

He spent most of his career attached to Porto, though was often loaned out, and also represented Paços de Ferreira and Braga in the Primeira Liga. Abroad, he played for four clubs in Turkey's Süper Lig, among them Bursaspor and Galatasaray.

Josué made his full debut for Portugal in 2013.

Club career

Early years and Paços
Born in Valongo, Porto District, Josué joined FC Porto's youth system at the age of nine. He spent his first two seasons as a senior on loan, both in Portugal and abroad, representing successively S.C. Covilhã, F.C. Penafiel (both in the Segunda Liga) and VVV-Venlo (Netherlands).

In summer 2011, Josué was released by Porto with only two official appearances to his credit, both in the Taça da Liga, and signed with F.C. Paços de Ferreira. He made his Primeira Liga debut on 17 September, playing the full 90 minutes in a 1–0 away loss against C.D. Nacional. In his second year he contributed 23 league appearances – 18 starts – as the club finished a best-ever third and qualified to the UEFA Champions League, and was chosen as Best Young Player in the competition in the process.

Return to Porto
Josué agreed on a return to former side Porto on 29 May 2013, penning a four-year contract and moving alongside manager Paulo Fonseca. On 10 August he won his first club honour, coming on as a substitute in a 3–0 win over Vitória de Guimarães in the Supertaça Cândido de Oliveira, and scored his first goal for his new team a week later starting and netting through a penalty kick in a 3–1 victory at Vitória de Setúbal.

Deemed surplus to requirements at Porto as practically all Portuguese players, Josué then spent 18 months on loan at Bursaspor. He made his Süper Lig debut on 30 August 2014, coming on as a late substitute in a 0–2 home loss to Galatasaray SK, and helped the team to the final of the Turkish Cup, notably contributing with a brace to a 3–2 away defeat of Samsunspor in the group phase on 24 December 2014. On 26 January 2016, he returned to his homeland and was loaned to S.C. Braga for the rest of the campaign, netting against his parent club in the decisive match of the Taça de Portugal that was won in a penalty shootout for their first such title in half a century.

On 23 August 2016, Josué returned to Turkey, joining Galatasaray on a season-long loan. He scored his first goal for the Istanbul-based team on 25 December, closing a 5–1 home win against Alanyaspor six minutes after replacing Eren Derdiyok.

Later career
Josué left Porto in August 2017, signing a two-year contract at Osmanlıspor again in Turkey's top flight. He was released in December, and resumed his career the following July with a deal of the same length at Akhisarspor. His side finished runners-up in the Turkish Cup to former club Galatasaray, with him scoring in both legs of a 5–2 aggregate victory over Kasımpaşa S.K. in the quarter-finals. In June 2019, however, after being relegated, he severed his ties to the organisation.

In September 2019, Josué signed for Hapoel Be'er Sheva F.C. of the Israeli Premier League for two years, joining compatriot Miguel Vítor. Later joined by David Simão, they won the State Cup in his first season, with him scoring in the semi-finals against Bnei Yehuda Tel Aviv F.C. on 10 June and the 2–0 final win over Maccabi Petah Tikva F.C. on 13 July.

Josué and Vítor halved their salaries in May 2020 to stay in Israel for another year. Ten months later, he extended his stay for one more season.

On 21 June 2021, Josué joined Polish Ekstraklasa champions Legia Warsaw on a two-year contract.

International career
Josué won 26 caps for Portugal across all youth levels, including 17 for the under-21 team. He made his debut with the full side on 11 October 2013, playing 21 minutes in a 1–1 home draw with Israel for the 2014 FIFA World Cup qualifiers.

In the second leg of the play-offs against Sweden on 19 November, Josué (who was not used in the game) extended his middle finger towards the opposing fans, while celebrating his country's qualification to the World Cup after the final whistle.

Career statistics

Club

International

Honours
Porto
Supertaça Cândido de Oliveira: 2013

Braga
Taça de Portugal: 2015–16

Akhisarspor
Turkish Super Cup: 2018

Hapoel Be'er Sheva
Israel State Cup: 2019–20

Individual
Primeira Liga Breakthrough Player of the Year: 2012–13
SJPF Young Player of the Month: February 2013

References

External links

1990 births
Living people
People from Valongo
Sportspeople from Porto District
Portuguese footballers
Association football midfielders
Primeira Liga players
Liga Portugal 2 players
FC Porto players
Padroense F.C. players
S.C. Covilhã players
F.C. Penafiel players
F.C. Paços de Ferreira players
S.C. Braga players
Eredivisie players
VVV-Venlo players
Süper Lig players
Bursaspor footballers
Galatasaray S.K. footballers
Ankaraspor footballers
Akhisarspor footballers
Israeli Premier League players
Hapoel Be'er Sheva F.C. players
Ekstraklasa players
Legia Warsaw players
Portugal youth international footballers
Portugal under-21 international footballers
Portugal international footballers
Portuguese expatriate footballers
Expatriate footballers in the Netherlands
Expatriate footballers in Turkey
Expatriate footballers in Israel
Expatriate footballers in Poland
Portuguese expatriate sportspeople in the Netherlands
Portuguese expatriate sportspeople in Turkey
Portuguese expatriate sportspeople in Israel
Portuguese expatriate sportspeople in Poland